Robert Droogmans nicknamed The Droog (born 5 September 1954) is a Belgian former rally driver. He was European Rally Champion in 1990.

External links
 WRC Results (eWRC)

Belgian rally drivers
1954 births
World Rally Championship drivers
European Rally Championship drivers
Living people\